The Battle of Mouquet Farm, also known as the Fighting for Mouquet Farm was part of the Battle of the Somme and began during the Battle of Pozières (23 July – 3 September). The fighting began on 23 July with attacks by the British Reserve Army. The farm was captured by the 3rd Canadian Division of the Canadian Corps on 16 September. The farm was lost to a German counter-attack, before being re-captured on 26 September during an attack by the 11th (Northern) Division during the Battle of Thiepval Ridge  No. 16 Section of the 6th Battalion East Yorkshire (Pioneers) smoked out the last German defenders.

Background

1916
Following the fighting that had occurred around the village earlier in the year, a decision was made by the British to gain control of the ridge beyond the village to create a gap in the German lines, behind the salient that had developed around the German-held fortress of Thiepval. By capturing Mouquet Farm, the British hoped that it would destabilise the German position and enable subsequent gains.

Battle

10 August – 3 September

During the night of 10 August, parties of the 4th Australian Division of the I Anzac Corps, attacked towards the farm and managed to establish advanced posts in the valley south of the farm and to the east. By 22 August, the 2nd Australian Division had made several more attempts on the farm and realised that the main defensive position was underground, where the Germans had excavated the cellars to create linked dug-outs. On 3 September, the 4th Australian Division attacked again with the 13th Brigade and captured much of the surface remains of the farm and trenches nearby, with hand-to-hand fighting in the ruins and underground.

16–26 September

During the battle, the divisions of I Anzac Corps advanced north-west along Pozières ridge, towards Mouquet Farm, with British divisions supporting on the left. The approaches to the farm were watched by German artillery observers, who directed artillery-fire on the attackers from three sides of the salient that had developed in the lines. Many casualties were caused to the attackers as they approached the farm; in August and into September, the Australians were repulsed three times.

The Canadian Corps relieved the I Anzac Corps on 5 September. The Canadians captured part of the farm on 16 September and were then repulsed by a counter-attack. By 25 September, further attacks had captured part of the farm on the surface but the Germans still held the cellars, dug-outs and tunnels beneath. The farm was captured on 26 September by the 34th Brigade of the 11th (Northern) Division, in the general attack of the Battle of Thiepval Ridge. The 9th Lancashire Fusiliers bombed the exits of the underground positions and also managed to reach the second objective, at the west end of  Trench, where German machine-gun nests had held up previous attacks. The 6th East Yorkshire (Pioneers) overwhelmed the last defenders with smoke grenades and took

Aftermath

Casualties
In the fighting around Pozières and Mouquet Farm, the I Anzac Corps suffered  During its second period on the Somme, the 1st Australian Division suffered  having already suffered  August. The 2nd Australian Division incurred  from 25 July to 7 August and another  to 29 August. From 29 July to 16 August the 4th Australian Division suffered  and another  27 August to 4 September.

Gallery

See also

 Battle of the Somme: order of battle

Notes

Footnotes

References

Further reading
Books
 
 
 
 

Websites

External links

 Contemporary photos of the battle sites
 Original photos

Conflicts in 1916
1916 in France
Battle of the Somme
Battles of World War I involving Australia